Raddia is a genus of South American plants in the grass family, most of the species found only in Brazil.

The genus was named for Italian botanist and herpetologist Giuseppe Raddi, 1770–1829.

Species
 Raddia angustifolia Soderstr. & Zuloaga - Bahia
 Raddia brasiliensis Bertol. - Rio de Janeiro, Bahia, Espírito Santo, Mato Grosso, Paraíba
 Raddia distichophylla (Steud. ex Nees) Chase - Bahia
 Raddia guianensis (Brongn.) C.L.Hitchc. - Trinidad & Tobago, Pará, French Guiana, Suriname, Venezuela (Carabobo, Yaracuy)
 Raddia lancifolia R.P.Oliveira & Longhi-Wagner - Espírito Santo
 Raddia megaphylla R.P.Oliveira & Longhi-Wagner - Espírito Santo, Bahia
 Raddia portoi Kuhlm. - Bahia
 Raddia soderstromii R.P.Oliveira, L.G.Clark & Judz. - Bahia, Rio Grande do Norte, Rio de Janeiro, Sergipe
 Raddia stolonifera R.P.Oliveira & Longhi-Wagner - Bahia

formerly included
see Arberella Crypsis Cryptochloa Piresia Raddiella

References

Bambusoideae genera
Grasses of South America
Grasses of Brazil
Bambusoideae